The  Dallas Texans season was the franchise's only season in the league while in Dallas after moving from New York, where they were previously known as the Yanks, and the continuation of the Dayton Triangles, the final remaining Ohio League franchise that had yet to fold. The franchise continued to struggle immensely and lost their first nine games, finishing 1–11, the worst record in the 12-team league.

After its seventh game, the franchise was returned to the NFL on November 14. The Texans' home game against the Chicago Bears was moved to Thanksgiving and to the Rubber Bowl in Akron, Ohio, and was their only victory.  The final home game with the Lions was moved to Briggs Stadium in Detroit.

The franchise was resurrected by the NFL, with the players and assets being purchased by Carroll Rosenbloom in 1953, and became known as the Colts in Baltimore, Maryland, with hall of famers Gino Marchetti and Art Donovan amongst others remaining with the team as a largely contiguous unit. 

Professional football did not return to the "Big D" until , with the addition of the Cowboys and the AFL's Texans (who relocated to Kansas City in 1963 and were rebranded as the Chiefs).

Regular season

Schedule

Standings

See also
 1951 New York Yanks season
 1953 Baltimore Colts season

References

Dallas Texans
Dallas Texans (NFL)
Dallas Texans seasons